After the Reality is a 2016 romance film written and directed by David Anderson and starring Matthew Morrison and Sarah Chalke. It was released by The Orchard.

Premise
A contestant (Matthew Morrison) on a Bachelorette style reality show is thrown into turmoil when the sudden death of his father forces him to quit the series prematurely and reconnect with his estranged sister (Sarah Chalke) at their family cabin.

Cast

 Matthew Morrison as Scottie
 Sarah Chalke as Kate
 Jon Dore as Fitz
 Laura Bell Bundy as Kelly
 Juan Pablo Di Pace as Dunkin
 Isaiah Mustafa as Garreth
 Tony Cavalero as Reg
 Aimee Garcia as Crystal
 Jane Lynch as Doctor
 John Heard as Bob
 Michael Fairman as Elmer Severson
 Katy Jacoby as Producer
 Max Gecowets as Rucke

References

External links

2016 films
The Orchard (company) films
Films shot in Minnesota
2010s English-language films